Wells Fargo Center is a  office building in downtown Sacramento, California. Construction on the skyscraper began in 1990, and construction completed in 1992. The building is the tallest in the city. The building occupies a  city block, and features a five-story granite and marble walled interior within a clear glass atrium. The project was developed by William Wilson & Associates in partnership with Crocker Properties. The architect was Hellmuth, Obata and Kassabaum (HOK).

A Wells Fargo History Museum dedicated to the history of Wells Fargo Bank in the Sacramento area is located in the ground floor lobby.

Major tenants 
Highlands Consulting Group
 Crowe LLP
 Il Fornaio
 CohnReznick
 Kronick, Moskovitz, Tiedemann & Girard
 Morrison & Foerster 
 Orrick, Herrinton & Sutcliffe
 PwC
 Weintraub Tobin
 Wells Fargo Bank
 Wilke, Fleury, Hoffelt, Gould & Birney,

Gallery

See also
List of tallest buildings in Sacramento

References

External links
 Wells Fargo Center, Sacramento at Hines Interests Limited Partnership
 Wells Fargo Center image gallery and information at SkyscraperPage
 Wells Fargo History Museums - Sacramento

Wells Fargo buildings
Skyscraper office buildings in Sacramento, California
Buildings and structures in Sacramento, California
Hines Interests Limited Partnership
Office buildings completed in 1992
HOK (firm) buildings